Dark Side of the Rainbow – also known as Dark Side of Oz or The Wizard of Floyd – is the pairing of the 1973 Pink Floyd album The Dark Side of the Moon with the 1939 film The Wizard of Oz. This produces moments of apparent synchronicity where the film and the album appear to correspond. Members of Pink Floyd have denied any intent to connect the album to the film.

History 
In August 1995, the Fort Wayne Journal Gazette published an article by Charles Savage suggesting that readers watch the 1939 film The Wizard of Oz while listening to the 1973 Pink Floyd album The Dark Side of the Moon. Savage said the idea was first shared on an online Pink Floyd newsgroup. According to Savage, if you start the album as the MGM lion roars for the first time onscreen, “The result is astonishing. It's as if the movie were one long art-film music video for the album. Song lyrics and titles match the action and plot. The music swells and falls with character's movements ... expect to see enough firm coincidences to make you wonder whether the whole thing was planned."

Fans created websites about the experience and catalogued moments of synchronicity. In April 1997, the DJ George Taylor Morris discussed "Dark Side of the Rainbow" on Boston radio. In July 2000, Turner Classic Movies aired The Wizard of Oz with the option of synchronising the broadcast to the album using the SAP audio channel.

Response 
Members of Pink Floyd have denied any connection between the album and the film. Guitarist David Gilmour dismissed it as the product of "some guy with too much time on his hands". Drummer Nick Mason told MTV in 1997, "It's absolute nonsense. It has nothing to do with The Wizard of Oz. It was all based on The Sound of Music." The Dark Side of the Moon audio engineer Alan Parsons also denied any connection, saying the band had no means of playing video tapes in the studio at the time of recording. He said in 2003:

Asked about the connection in 2022, the bassist, Roger Waters, said it was "bullshit" and that had "nothing to do" with anyone who worked on the album.

Detractors argue that the phenomenon is the result of the mind's tendency to find patterns by discarding data that does not fit. The film critic Richard Roeper published his assessment of the phenomenon, which he referred to as "Dark Side of Oz". Roeper concluded that while Pink Floyd may have had the resources and technical abilities to produce an alternative film soundtrack, undergoing such an endeavour would have been impractical. Roeper also noted that The Dark Side of the Moon is approximately an hour shorter than The Wizard of Oz.

Variations 
The fame of Dark Side of the Rainbow has prompted some to search for synchronicities among other albums by other bands and films by other directors.  The lengthy Pink Floyd song "Echoes" from the 1971 album Meddle has been paired with "Jupiter and Beyond the Infinite", the fourth act in the 1968 film 2001: A Space Odyssey. Both the track and the sequence are approximately 23 minutes. Comedian Matt Herzau claims that the Pixar film WALL-E syncs up with Pink Floyd's rock opera The Wall, which he has called "Another Brick in the WALL-E", after the album's three-part song "Another Brick in the Wall". Podcast host Griffin McElroy has praised the synchronicity between Dark Side of the Moon and Paul Blart: Mall Cop 2 in the podcast 'Til Death Do Us Blart.

See also 
Apophenia
Lincoln-Kennedy coincidences urban legend
Pareidolia
Synchronicity

References 

Alternative versions of soundtracks
Pink Floyd
Synchronicity
The Wizard of Oz (1939 film)
Coincidence
Urban legends
Audiovisual introductions in 1995